Mojtame-ye Meskuni Farhangian (also Romanized as Mojtame`-ye Meskūnī Farhangīān) is a village in Goli Jan Rural District, in the Central District of Tonekabon County, Mazandaran Province, Iran. At the 2006 census, its population was 558, in 164 families.

References 

Populated places in Tonekabon County